Uniontown is the largest city in and county seat of Fayette County, Pennsylvania, United States,  southeast of Pittsburgh. The population was 9,984 at the 2020 census.  It is part of the Pittsburgh metropolitan area.

History
Uniontown was founded by Henry Beeson on July 4, 1776 (coincidentally, the same date the United States Declaration of Independence was adopted).  The National Road, also known as the Cumberland Road, was routed through Uniontown in the early 19th century, and the town grew along with the road (now US 40).  southeast of Uniontown is Fort Necessity, built by George Washington during the French and Indian War (part of the international Seven Years' War) as well as the site of the Battle of Jumonville Glen, where the North American branch of the war began.

Uniontown's role in the Underground Railroad in the antebellum years is commemorated by a marker on the corner of East Main Street and Baker Alley. Residents helped slaves escaping from the South to freedom.

In the late nineteenth century, the town grew based on the development of coal mines and the steel industry. Uniontown was the site of violent clashes between striking coal miners and guards at the local coke works during the bituminous coal miners' strike of 1894. Fifteen guards armed with carbines and machine guns held off an attack by 1,500 strikers, killing five and wounding eight.

The Columbia Rolling Mill, an iron and steel works, was located in Uniontown from 1887 to 1895. The mill was the town's top industry at that time. During the Coal Boom of the early part of the 20th century, Uniontown was home to at least 13 millionaires, the most (per capita) of any city in the United States. "Coal barons" and Carl Laemmle, the president of Universal Films, sponsored the famous Uniontown Speedway board track from 1916 to 1922. It was a mile and a quarter raceway.

As with most of Western Pennsylvania, Uniontown's economy waned during the region's deindustrialization of the late 20th century, when the steel industry restructured and many jobs went elsewhere, including offshore. This decline continued into the 21st century, and the population is about half its peak of 1940.

The USS Uniontown (PF-65), a Tacoma-class frigate, was named for the city by the United States Navy on August 16, 1944, the only ship to be so named.

In 1967, Uniontown was the birthplace of the McDonald's Big Mac sandwich. In 2007, the Big Mac Museum was opened in North Huntingdon Township in Westmoreland County, to the disappointment of some Uniontown residents.  According to a McDonald's spokesperson, the decision was based on logistics and access, but Uniontown residents complained in an article that was published in The Herald-Standard.

The Uniontown Downtown Historic District, Gallatin School, John S. Douglas House, John P. Conn House, and Adam Clarke Nutt Mansion are listed on the National Register of Historic Places.

Geography 
Uniontown is located slightly west of the center of Fayette County at 39°54'0" North, 79°43'28" West (39.900040, -79.724478).

The National Pike or Cumberland Road crossed over the mountains and passed through the area which became the center of Uniontown. The route is now Business Route 40, as the mainline of US 40 bypasses the city center to the south and west as a freeway loop called the George Marshall Parkway.

Climate
Uniontown lies in a transition between a humid continental climate (Köppen Dfa) and a humid subtropical climate (Köppen Cfa) with cold (sometimes freezing cold) to mild winters, owing its location near the mountains with average daytime temperatures running in the 30s to 40s °F (0-10°C) and warm to hot and humid summers with average daytime temperatures running in the 70s to 80s °F (20-30°C).

Government
Uniontown's government is composed of a mayor and a five-member city council. The current mayor is Bill Gerke.

Uniontown is in Pennsylvania's 14th congressional district and is currently represented in the United States House of Representatives by Republican Guy Reschenthaler and in the United States Senate by Democrat Bob Casey Jr. and Democrat John Fetterman.

Demographics

As of the census of 2010, there were 10,372 people, 5,423 households, and 3,031 families residing in the city. The population density was 5136 people per square mile (2,351.1/km). There were 6,320 housing units at an average density of 3,103.0 per square mile (1,196.2/km). The racial makeup of the city was 75.16% White, 18.90% African American, 0.36% Native American, 0.93% Asian, 0.03% Pacific Islander, 0.30% from other races, and 3.67% from two or more races. Hispanic or Latino of any race were 1.59% of the population.

The largest white ethnic groups in Uniontown: 15.4% German, 13.4% Irish, 9% Italian, 6% Dutch, 5.6% English, 5.5% Polish.

There were 5,423 households, out of which 23.7% had children under the age of 18.2 living with them, 35.8% were married couples living together, 16.0% had a female householder with no husband present, and 44.1% were non-families. 39.7% of all households were made up of individuals, and 19.5% had someone living alone who was 75 years of age or older. The average household size was 2.27 and the average family size was 2.791.

In the city, the population was spread out, with 20.9% under the age of 18, 8.6% from 18 to 24, 26.1% from 25 to 44, 22.4% from 45 to 64, and 22.0% who were 65 years of age or older. The median age was 39 years. For every 100 females, there were 86.2 males. For every 100 females age 18 and over, there were 81.5 males.

In 2012 the median income for a household in the city was $31,760, and the median income for a family was $37,841. The per capita income for the city was $22,457.

Education

K-12
Uniontown Area School District
Laurel Highlands School District
St. John the Evangelist Regional Catholic School
Chestnut Ridge School (non- denominational)

Higher education
Westmoreland County Community College, Uniontown Education Center
Penn State Fayette, The Eberly Campus
Laurel Business Institute
United Career Institute, formerly West Virginia Career Institute and  Pennsylvania Institute of Health and Technology
Madison College (Pennsylvania), a former school operated by the Methodist Episcopal Church

Services

Uniontown Hospital, the larger of two hospitals in the county, is the city's and Fayette County's largest employer.

The City of Uniontown operates a full-time police department. The city police station houses a booking center used by all police agencies within Fayette County, including the Pennsylvania State Police.

The City of Uniontown Bureau of Fire is a combination career/volunteer department operating out of three stations (two staffed and one reserve), and provides services including fire suppression, fire prevention, various aspects of rescue operations, pre fire and disaster planning, fire safety consultation services, disaster response along with city Emergency Management personnel, and a number of other public services. EMS service is provided by Fayette EMS, which replaced the former Uniontown Fireman's Ambulance in July 2013.

The bureau has four engines (pumping apparatus), two Trucks (aerial apparatus), a heavy rescue unit, a squad truck, and a command S.U.V.

Station 1 or, Central Station, is located downtown on North Beeson Boulevard at Penn Street. Central Station houses Engine #1, Engine #4, Truck #1, Rescue, Squad, Command Unit, and provides housing for two Fayette EMS units as well. Station 2, or the East End Station, is located on Connellsville Street near Lincoln Street. The East End Station houses Engine #3 and Truck "A". The 3rd station, the Union Hose Building, located on East Main Street near Grant Street, houses the city's Emergency Management Agency and Emergency Operations Center, and provides housing for the fire bureau's reserve pumper, Engine #5.

The department has three accredited PA Fire Academy Local Level Instructors and a number of professional qualifications board testing evaluators.

Media

The Herald-Standard, a newspaper based in Uniontown, serves the city and much of the surrounding area.
Fayette TV provides local programming on Breezeline Cable channel 77.
Two radio stations are licensed to the Uniontown area on 590 AM, 101.1FM WMBS and 99.3 FM WPKL.

Transportation
Uniontown is an important crossroads in Fayette County. The main route around town is a stretch of freeway bypass, the George Marshall Parkway, which is composed of parts of US 40 and US 119. US 119 enters the area as a two-lane route from Morgantown, West Virginia, and provides the northern half of the bypass before becoming a four-lane route to Connellsville. US 40 enters the region as a two-lane route from Brownsville. It serves as the southern half of the freeway before becoming a mountainous route through rural parts of the county and enters Maryland and reaches Interstate 68. The old portions of US 40, now signed as Business 40, serve the downtown area.

PA 51, a main four-lane route to Pittsburgh, and PA 21, which connects Fayette County with Greene County and Waynesburg, both terminate in Uniontown. PA 43, part of the Mon-Fayette Expressway project to connect Pittsburgh with Morgantown, West Virginia is complete around the Uniontown area.

Local bus service is provided by Fayette Area Coordinated Transportation.

Notable people

 Professional wrestler Bruiser Brody (1946-1988), known as Frank Donald Goodish outside the ring.
 Henry Bidleman Bascom (1796-1850), religious circuit rider, U.S. congressional chaplain, Methodist bishop, first president of Madison College
Henry White Beeson (1791-1863), former member of the U.S. House of Representatives
John Dickson Carr, mystery writer born in Uniontown
 Robert J. Cenker, engineer and RCA astronaut born in Uniontown
William E. Crow (1870-1922), former United States Senator
 Ernie Davis (1939-1963), first African-American Heisman Trophy winner, lived in Uniontown for most of his early life
John Littleton Dawson (1813-1870), former member of the U.S. House of Representatives
Jim Delligatti (1918-2016), Big Mac Inventor, born in Uniontown
Tory Epps (1976-2005), former NFL Defensive Lineman
Dr. Mark Esper (1964-), 27th United States Secretary of Defense under President Donald Trump, born in Uniontown
George Bird Evans, noted illustrator, mystery novelist, gunning and bird dog writer, and dog breeder
 Ronne Froman (RADM, USN, Ret.), born in Uniontown
Gus Gerard, former ABA and NBA player
Thomas Irwin (1785-1870), former member of the U.S. House of Representatives and former U.S. District Court judge
 William James, former NFL cornerback born and raised in Uniontown

 Stu Lantz, former NBA player and color commentator for the Los Angeles Lakers, played basketball for Uniontown High School and led them to a PIAA state championship in 1964
 James Lawson, civil rights leader born in Uniontown in 1928
 General of the Army George C. Marshall, American military leader, Secretary of State, and the third Secretary of Defense, born in Uniontown
 Terry Mulholland, former Major League baseball player, born and raised in Uniontown
 Chuck Muncie, former NFL star running back for the New Orleans Saints and San Diego Chargers, originally from Uniontown
 Nelson Munsey, former NFL cornerback for the Baltimore Colts and Minnesota Vikings, originally from Uniontown
 David Nehls, actor, singer, composer and lyricist 
 Larry Pennell, actor of film and television, born in Uniontown in 1928 
Kaleb Ramsey, former NFL player
 Wil Robinson former NBA/ABA player, also a West Virginia University all-time great
Sandy Stephens, first African-American quarterback for the University of Minnesota Golden Gophers, born in Uniontown
Andrew Stewart (1791-1872), former member of the U.S. House of Representatives
Daniel Sturgeon (1789-1878), former United States Senator
Tom Wilson, cartoonist, noted for the comic strip Ziggy.
Gene Steratore, former NFL football and NCAA basketball referee and current a rules analyst for CBS Sports, born and raised in Uniontown

See also
National Register of Historic Places listings in Fayette County, Pennsylvania

References

Further reading
 James Hadden, A History of Uniontown: The County Seat of Fayette County, Pennsylvania. Akron, OH: New Werner Co., 1913.

External links

 

 
Cities in Fayette County, Pennsylvania
County seats in Pennsylvania
Pittsburgh metropolitan area
Populated places established in 1776
Populated places on the Underground Railroad
Cities in Pennsylvania
1776 establishments in Pennsylvania